Kaleva or Kalevi may refer to:
 CWT Kaleva Travel, a travel management company based in Finland
 Kalevi (mythology), the great king of Kainuu in Finnish, Karelian and Estonian mythology
 Kaleva (wasp), a wasp genus in the subfamily Pteromalinae
 Kaleva (Tampere), a portion of the city of Tampere, Finland
 Kaleva Church
 Kaleva (airplane), registered as OH-ALL, airliner shot down by Soviet bombers in 1940
 Kaleva (newspaper), a newspaper founded in 1899 in Oulu in northern Finland
 Kaleva, Michigan, a village in the United States, founded by Finnish settlers
 Atte Kaleva, Finnish member of parliament
 Kaleva Mutual Insurance Company, Finnish insurance company. Part of Sampo Group.